is a district located in Gifu Prefecture, Japan. As of July, 2011 the district has an estimated population of 52,536. The total area is 615.17 km2.

Towns and villages
Hichisō
Higashishirakawa
Kawabe
Sakahogi
Shirakawa
Tomika
Yaotsu

District timeline
 April 1, 1897 - The villages of Sakakura, Torikumi, Ōhari, Kuroiwa, Fukagaya, Katsuyama and Fukada merge to form the village of Sakahogi.
 August 10, 1950 - The Fukada part of Sakahogi merges into the town of Ōta.
 October 1, 1968 - The village of Sakahogi gains town status.

References

Districts in Gifu Prefecture